Dyte may refer to:

People
 David Moses Dyte ( 1770–1830), English Jewish quill merchant
 Jack Dyte (1918–1974), Canadian ice hockey defenceman

Other
 DYTE-TV
 Kategoria e Dytë, third level of football in Albania